IEEE 802.11 (legacy mode) or more correctly IEEE 802.11-1997 or IEEE 802.11-1999 refer to the original version of the IEEE 802.11 wireless networking standard released in 1997 and clarified in 1999.  Most of the protocols described by this early version are rarely used today.

Description
It specified two raw data rates of 1 and 2 megabits per second (Mbit/s) to be transmitted via infrared (IR) signals or by either frequency hopping or direct-sequence spread spectrum (DSSS) in the Industrial Scientific Medical frequency band at 2.4  GHz. IR remained a part of the standard until IEEE 802.11-2016, but was never implemented.

The original standard also defines carrier sense 0 access with collision avoidance (CSMA/CA) as the medium access method. A significant percentage of the available raw channel capacity is sacrificed (via the CSMA/CA mechanisms) in order to improve the reliability of data transmissions under diverse and adverse environmental conditions.

IEEE 802.11-1999 also introduced the binary time unit TU defined as 1024 µs.

At least six different, somewhat-interoperable, commercial products appeared using the original specification, from companies like Alvarion (PRO.11 and BreezeAccess-II), BreezeCom, Digital / Cabletron (RoamAbout), Lucent, Netwave Technologies (AirSurfer Plus and AirSurfer Pro), Symbol Technologies (Spectrum25), and Proxim Wireless (OpenAir and Rangela2). A weakness of this original specification was that it offered so many choices that interoperability was sometimes challenging to realize. It is really more of a "beta specification" than a rigid specification, initially allowing individual product vendors the flexibility to differentiate their products but with little to no inter-vendor operability.

The DSSS version of legacy 802.11 was rapidly supplemented (and popularized) by the 802.11b amendment in 1999, which increased the bit rate to 11 Mbit/s.  Widespread adoption of 802.11 networks only occurred after the release of 802.11b which resulted in multiple interoperable products becoming available from multiple vendors.  Consequently, comparatively few networks were implemented on the 802.11-1997 standard.

Comparison

References

Further reading
 
 

1997